NGC 325 is a spiral galaxy located in the constellation Cetus. It was discovered on September 27, 1864 by Albert Marth. It was described by Dreyer as "very faint, very small".

References

External links
 

0325
18640927
Cetus (constellation)
Spiral galaxies
Discoveries by Albert Marth
003454